The Communauté d'agglomération de Fécamp Caux Littoral is the communauté d'agglomération, an intercommunal structure, centred on the town of Fécamp. It is located in the Seine-Maritime department, in the Normandy region, northern France. It was created on 1 January 2015 from the former communauté de communes de Fécamp. It absorbed the former Communauté de communes du Canton de Valmont on 1 January 2017. Its area is 207.1 km2. Its population was 38,310 in 2019, of which 18,041 in Fécamp proper. Its seat is in Fécamp.

Composition
The communauté d'agglomération consists of the following 33 communes:

Ancretteville-sur-Mer
Angerville-la-Martel
Colleville
Contremoulins
Criquebeuf-en-Caux
Écretteville-sur-Mer
Életot
Épreville
Fécamp
Froberville
Ganzeville
Gerponville
Gerville
Limpiville
Les Loges
Maniquerville
Riville
Sainte-Hélène-Bondeville
Saint-Léonard
Saint-Pierre-en-Port
Sassetot-le-Mauconduit
Senneville-sur-Fécamp
Sorquainville
Thérouldeville
Theuville-aux-Maillots
Thiergeville
Thiétreville
Tourville-les-Ifs
Toussaint
Valmont
Vattetot-sur-Mer
Yport
Ypreville-Biville

References 

Fecamp
Fecamp